Ioannis Garifallos (born 15 September 1957) is a Greek former water polo player who competed in the 1980 Summer Olympics. He played for Greek powerhouse Ethnikos Piraeus. He is the son of “Patriarch of Greek water polo” Andreas Garyfallos. He played in the 70s and 80s winning 16 Greek championships (14 consecutive) with his childhood club Ethnikos.

Titles 
Greek championship (16): 1969, 1970, 1972, 1973, 1974, 1975, 1976, 1977, 1978, 1979, 1980, 1981, 1982, 1983, 1984, 1985

Greek cup (2): 1984, 1985

References

1957 births
Living people
Greek male water polo players
Olympic water polo players of Greece
Water polo players at the 1980 Summer Olympics

Ethnikos Piraeus Water Polo Club players
Water polo players from Athens